Al Rítmo de tu Corazón (To the beat of your heart) was a Colombian telenovela produced by Teleset for RCN Television. The show starred Jaider Villa and Gabriela Villalba. It aired for 62 episodes, starting in August 2004.

Storyline 
The story centers around Catalina Andrade, a talented 17-year-old studying at a prestigious school in the city, although she is from a middle-class family. Catalina thinks that she is there on a scholarship, but does not know that her grandfather, Matias Duque, paid for her schooling before he died. Catalina does not know that her former music teacher and protector, Don Matias, was her grandfather. Catalina is the result of a relationship between her mother, a teacher, and Fernando Duque, father of James and son of Matias. Fernando never recognized her as his daughter.

Matias died in a suspicious accident. At the funeral, Catalina meets Santiago, grandson of Matias. She is captivated by him. Matias's apparent accident may have been caused by Brenda, the mother of James, as a strategy to control the direction of the school and bring her son back to Paris. To trap her child, Brenda makes him stay as a music teacher at the school. With the help of Daniela Tovar, his former girlfriend, she will attempt to return him to her. But the arrival of Santiago at school reunites him with Catalina, and her feelings are more intense.

Catalina and her classmate, Lina Ruiz, are rivals for Santiago's love.

Cast 
 Jaider Villa as Santiago
 Gabriela Villalba as Catalina
 Myriam de Lourdes as Brenda
 Haydée Ramírez as María Clara
 Carlos Muñoz as Matías
 Paola Díaz as Daniela
 Hannah Zea as María Mónica
 Andreah Patapi as Karen
 José Rojas as Aníbal
 Franky Linero as Germán
 Pedro Palacio as Oswaldo
 Mauro Urquijo as Iván Ruiz 
 Diana Neira as Yudy 
 Paula Bedoya as Eliana 
 Jery Sandoval as Cata
 Jenni Osorio as Lina Vanessa
 Alejandra Sandoval as Paola 
 María Teresa Barreto as Tatiana 
 César Navarro as Jonathan 
 Mara Echeverri as Judith
 Inés Mejía as Maruja 
 Isabel Campos as Inés 
 John Ceballos as Manuel 
 John Paul Ospina as Luis Carlos 
 Elda Salas as Jimena 
 Andrés Ruiz as Rodrigo 
 Geoffrey W. Deakin as Juan Diego 
 Maria Alejandra Lopez as Silvia
 Juan Pablo Rueda as Julio 
 Martha Liliana Ruiz as Beatriz
 Víctor Cifuentes as Pedro 
 María Claudia Torres as Susana 
 Lucero Galindo as Elvia

Production 
 General Production: Andrés Posada
 Director: Roberto Reyes Toledo
 Original idea: Alexi Castillo
 Writer: Rocío Montoya and Irasema Otero
 Production Executive: Jairo Matallana
 Director of Photography: Gilberto Alirio Rodriguez
 Art Direction: Fernando Jose Moseres
 Editing: Kike Pérez
 Casting: Alberto Rodríguez

References 
 Teleset

External links 

2004 Colombian television series debuts
Colombian telenovelas
2000s high school television series
Children's telenovelas
Teen telenovelas
Television series about teenagers